Kanti is a town and a notified area in Muzaffarpur district in the Indian state of Bihar. It is also a block headquarters belongs to "Tirhut Division". It is located 15 km by road from District headquarters Muzaffarpur. Kanti holds a distinct history for it was a spot for indigo production. Kanti was once a site for saltpeter production.  In 2022, Kanti Nagar Panchayat was upgraded to Nagar Parishad (Municipal Council). Pin Code 843109.

Transportation 
Kanti is connected by rail and Kanti railway station is situated on Muzaffarpur–Gorakhpur main line. It is 13 km by railway from Muzaffarpur Junction and 4 km from Piprahan.

Demographics
 India census, Kanti had a population of 272,858. Males constitute 53% of the population and females 47%. Kanti has an average literacy rate of 66.68%, lower than the national average of 74.04%: male literacy is 61.01%, and female literacy is 48.27%. In Kanti, 17.54% of the population is under 6 years of age. Shubham Priyadarshan lives here.

References

Cities and towns in Muzaffarpur district